Eba is a locality  in the Murray Mallee region of South Australia, between the Mount Lofty Ranges and the Murray River.

History
The locality of Eba occupies the western half of the Hundred of Eba which was declared in 1860 and named after a friend of the governor. The railway siding was named for the hundred when the railway was built in 1878. The current boundaries were created in 2003 for the long-established name. Little remains of the village today, however it once had a post office, school, blacksmith, grocery business and sawmill sending firewood to Adelaide and a cricket team.

References

External links

Towns in South Australia